Action (aka Action Theater) was a planned 1945 NBC radio anthology series of action-adventure tales. However, the series went no further than the first audition drama, although an announcement on the show reveals an adaptation of Joseph Conrad's "Victory" (with Nancy Kelly and Roger Pryor) was scheduled, along with stories by Ernest Hemingway and Jack London.

Performing before a live studio audience, Jane Wyatt and Robert Lowery starred in the pilot program, "High Explosive", with a supporting cast of Ralph Sanford and Tom Holland. It was adapted by writer-director Maxwell Shane (1905-1983) from Paramount's High Explosive (1943), a film scripted by Shane and Howard J. Green from a story by Joseph Hoffman.

Produced by Irvin Atkins for Radio Creators, "High Explosive" aired January 15, 1945, with music by Gregory Stone. It was introduced by host William Gargan and announcer Art Baker with a commentary by Shane in the middle of the show. Best known in the 1940s for his Big Town screenplays and radio scripts, Shane later scripted City Across the River, the 1949 film of Irving Shulman's The Amboy Dukes, and he was a writer-producer for TV's Thriller (1960-62).

Listen to
Same Time, Same Station: Action: "High Explosive" (January 15, 1945), heard after two other 30-minute shows

References

American radio dramas
1940s American radio programs
NBC radio programs